Otisville is a village in Forest Township, Genesee County in the U.S. state of Michigan.  The population was 864 at the 2010 census. It is located along M-15, just south of M-57.

History
The first land entry for the Forest (after the heavy growth of trees) community was made in March 1836 by James Seymour. The first settlers, Henry Heister and family, came in 1837. The township was organized in 1837, with the second settler, Nathaniel Smith, elected supervisor. In 1851, a sawmill was built by John Hayes, who sold the mill to Francis Otis the next year. On February 14, 1855, the post office opened with postmaster John Crawford. On April 5, 1861, the post office was renamed to Otisville. The village was platted by William F. Otis and T.D. Crocker in 1863. In 1874, a station opened by the Pere Marquette Railway in the village.

The Village of Otisville was incorporated in 1877.

Geography

Demographics

2010 census
As of the census of 2010, there were 864 people, 342 households, and 225 families living in the village. The racial makeup of the village was 97.8% White, 0.5% African American, 0.5% Native American, 0.1% Asian, 0.1% from other races, and 1.0% from two or more races. Hispanic or Latino of any race were 1.2% of the population.

There were 342 households, of which 36.3% had children under the age of 18 living with them, 46.2% were married couples living together, 13.5% had a female householder with no husband present, 6.1% had a male householder with no wife present, and 34.2% were non-families. 30.4% of all households were made up of individuals, and 10.8% had someone living alone who was 65 years of age or older. The average household size was 2.53 and the average family size was 3.09.

The median age in the village was 36.9 years. 27.3% of residents were under the age of 18; 7.7% were between the ages of 18 and 24; 24.5% were from 25 to 44; 27.4% were from 45 to 64, and 13.2% were 65 years of age or older. The gender makeup of the village was 49.7% male and 50.3% female.

2000 census
As of the census of 2000, there were 882 people, 343 households, and 244 families living in the village. The racial makeup of the village was 96.15% White, 1.02% African American, 0.45% Native American, 0.11% Pacific Islander, 0.57% from other races, and 1.70% from two or more races. Hispanic or Latino of any race were 1.59% of the population.

There were 343 households, out of which 38.5% had children under the age of 18 living with them, 51.9% were married couples living together, 14.3% had a female householder with no husband present, and 28.6% were non-families. 23.9% of all households were made up of individuals, and 9.0% had someone living alone who was 65 years of age or older.  The average household size was 2.57 and the average family size was 2.99.

In the village, the population was spread out, with 27.4% under the age of 18, 10.9% from 18 to 24, 32.3% from 25 to 44, 19.8% from 45 to 64, and 9.5% who were 65 years of age or older.  The median age was 32 years. For every 100 females, there were 92.2 males.  For every 100 females age 18 and over, there were 86.0 males.

The median income for a household in the village was $40,341, and the median income for a family was $45,769. Males had a median income of $44,167 versus $21,083 for females. The per capita income for the village was $17,540.  About 3.4% of families and 6.0% of the population were below the poverty line, including 3.7% of those under age 18 and 12.9% of those age 65 or over.

References

Villages in Genesee County, Michigan
Villages in Michigan
1836 establishments in Michigan Territory